Red Crag  or Red Rock was a 1961 novel based partly on fact by Chinese authors Luo Guangbin and Yang Yiyan, who were former inmates in a Kuomintang prison in Sichuan. It was set in Chongqing during the Chinese Civil War in 1949, and featured underground communist agents under the command of Zhou Enlai fighting an espionage battle against the Kuomintang.

The novel contained a highly negative portrayal for the Sino-American Cooperative Organization, as responsible for the running prisons jailing communists and other political dissidents, although in reality they were actually run by the KMT secret police service BIS, and had no American involvement. The main protagonist Jiang Xueqin, or "Sister Jiang", is based on the Communist revolutionary Jiang Zhuyun (1920–1949).

Xujun Eberlein wrote in The Atlantic that "The novel played a critical role in the heroism culture of the Mao era."

The book includes a poem that was attributed to, but was not written by, the revolutionary "martyr" Chen Ran (陈然, 1923－1949).

Adaptations
The 1964 Chinese-language western-style opera titled Sister Jiang is based on the novel. The opera was composed by Yang Ming and Jiang Chunyang, musicians of the art bureau of the Chinese Air Force.

In 2002, at the invitation of the German World Art Festival, director Zhang Yuan presented a Peking opera (also titled Sister Jiang), with Zhang Huoding in the title role, at the Cologne Grand Theater - the first major presentation of a revolutionary opera in Europe. Zhang Yuan made a film version of the production in 2003.

In 2004, a Peking opera titled Hua Ziliang was produced by Tianjin Chinese Opera Theater for DVD in 2004 with Wang Pin in the title role. Hua Ziliang is a character from the novel.

A 2010 CCTV-1 TV series also titled Sister Jiang is also based on this novel.

References

1961 novels
20th-century Chinese novels
Fiction set in 1949
Chinese Civil War
Chinese novels adapted into plays
Chinese novels adapted into television series
Novels set in Chongqing